The kai-to, sometimes kaito or kaido is a type of small, motorised ferry that operates in Hong Kong. They are usually used to serve remote coastal settlements in the territory's outlying islands.

There are currently 78 fixed kai-to routes, mostly used to ferry passengers between the outlying islands of Lantau Island, Peng Chau, Cheung Chau, and Lamma Island, among others, to the west of Hong Kong, and to enclave villages in the Tolo Harbour, Double Haven, Port Shelter, etc. in eastern New Territories.

Certain routes within Victoria Harbour are still served by Kai-tos, including the Sai Wan Ho to Kwun Tong route.

Operators
 Coral Sea Ferry - 3 routes
 Peng Chau Kaito Ltd
 Lum Kay Kaito - 1 routes
 Chuen Kee Ferry
 Tsui Wah Ferry
 Fortune Ferry

Places served
 Aberdeen
 Chek Keng
 Cheung Chau
 Clear Water Bay
 Discovery Bay
 Hei Ling Chau
 Kwun Tong
 Ma Wan
 Peng Chau
 Sai Wan Ho
 Sam Ka Tsuen 
 Sham Chung
 Shau Kei Wan (A Kung Ngam)
 Tai O
 Tap Mun
 Tsing Lung Tau 
 Tuen Mun
 Wan Tsai
 Wong Shek Pier

References

 Other License and KaiTao Ferry Company

Transport in Hong Kong
Ferry transport in Hong Kong
Cantonese words and phrases